Walnut Township is a township in Jefferson County, Iowa, USA.

References

Townships in Jefferson County, Iowa
Townships in Iowa